This is a list of notable events in country music that took place in the year 1944.

Events
 January 8 – Billboard publishes its first "Most Played Juke Box Folk Records" chart, the first widespread method of tracking the nationwide popularity of current country music songs. The first No. 1 song is "Pistol Packin' Mama" by both Al Dexter and Bing Crosby and The Andrews Sisters. However, from January to August 26, 1944, "Race" records were also included. The September 2, 1944 chart forward is the predecessor to today's Hot Country Songs chart.
 1944 - Elton Britt received the first gold record for a hillbilly/country music song, 1942's "There's a Star Spangled Banner Waving Somewhere."

Top hits of the year

Number one hits
from The Billboard's "Most Played Juke Box Folk Records" chart
(As certified by Billboard magazine)

Top Hillbilly-Folk (Country) Recordings 1944

On August 1, 1942, a strike by the American Federation of Musicians ended all recording sessions. Record companies kept business going by releasing recordings from their vaults, but by mid-1943, alternate sources were running dry, as the strike continued. Decca was the first company to settle in September 1943, but RCA Victor and Columbia held on until November 1944. It comes as no surprise that eleven of the top twenty records of 1944 were released by Decca, with two more by Capitol, the second company to settle. The remaining seven were released by Okeh, the label revived in 1940 by CBS to replace Vocalion, now the C&W division of Columbia Records, and apparently unaffected by the strike. Sadly, it would be put to sleep again in 1945, when releases were switched to the parent label.

In response to the growing popularity of Hillbilly (Country) music, The Billboard's "Most Played Juke Box Folk Records" chart, began on January 8, 1944, but for reasons unknown, included "Race" records, despite a chart already existing for those. On September 2, race records were abruptly removed, including the two top records from the prior week. Our chart does not include R&B records, and is also supplemented with record sales information (the new chart only rates jukebox plays) and other factors. As always, numerical rankings are approximate.

Top new album releases

Births 
 January 26 – Dave Rowland, singer and member of (Dave & Sugar) (died 2018).
 April 27 – Herb Pedersen, musician and member of The Desert Rose Band.
 June 21 – Kenny O'Dell, singer-songwriter (died 2018).
 July 20 – T.G. Sheppard, pop-styled country performer and one of the most successful stars of the 1970s and 1980s.
 July 30 – Chris Darrow, American musician (Nitty Gritty Dirt Band) (died 2020).
 August 8 – Michael Johnson, pop singer who had a string of country hits in the 1980s (died 2017)
 August 19 – Eddy Raven, singer-songwriter who successfully fused elements of cajun music with contemporary country sounds.
 December 4 – Chris Hillman, ex-member of The Byrds who formed the 1980s country-rock band The Desert Rose Band.
 December 11 – Brenda Lee, "Little Miss Dynamite", pop-rockabilly singer who went to country music in the late 1960s.

Deaths

See also
List of Most Played Juke Box Folk Records number ones of 1944

References

Further reading 
 Kingsbury, Paul, Vinyl Hayride: Country Music Album Covers 1947–1989, Country Music Foundation, 2003
 Millard, Bob, Country Music: 70 Years of America's Favorite Music, HarperCollins, New York, 1993
 Whitburn, Joel. Top Country Songs 1944–2005 – 6th Edition. 2005.

Country
Country music by year